The Bangladesh Supreme Court Bar Association is an association of Supreme Court lawyers in Bangladesh.

History
The Bangladesh Supreme Court Bar Association issued a statement expressing concern over the construction of Farakka Barrage by India near the border and preventing the flow of water to Bangladesh in February 1976.

In 1987, the President of association was detained and placed in Dhaka Central Jail as part of a wider crackdown on dissent against the dictatorship of President Hussain Mohammad Ershad. In 1999, President of the association, Habibul Islam Bhuiyan, moved a petition in the Appellate Division of the Supreme Court alleging statements of Prime Minister Sheikh Hasina was contemptuous of the court.

On 2 March 2005, Chief Justice of Bangladesh J. R. Mudassir Husain and other judges of the Supreme Court boycotted the break-up party of the association. President of the association, Barrister Rokanuddin Mahmud, reported that the judges boycotted the event as they felt certain judges were not invited respectfully.

In October 2017, the association expressed concern over the sudden leave of Chief Justice Surendra Kumar Sinha. According to President Advocate Zainul Abedin they failed in their attempt to meet Sinha which his described as alarming.

President of the Bangladesh Supreme Court Bar Association, Advocate Zainul Abedin, demanded that the government cancel the 11th national election and hold a new election on 3 January 2019 citing irregularities in the election. he stated that the new elections should be held under a neutral non-partisan government.

In April 2020, the association started providing interest free loans to lawyers facing financial difficulties during the COVID-19 pandemic in Bangladesh. On 9 October 2020, President of the Supreme Court Bar Association, AM Amin Uddin, was appointed the Attorney General of Bangladesh.

On 10 November 2020, the association sent a letter to the Chief Justice Syed Mahmud Hossain requesting mediation in a dispute between judges and lawyers. Two lawyers, Syed Sayedul Haque Suman and Ishrat Hasan, had appeared before the chief justice and according to them were treated with "discourteous behaviour" about which they posted on Facebook. Justice Gobinda Chandra Tagore and Justice Mohammad Ullah issued a contempt of court ruling against them over the Facebook posts.

On 13 March 2021, Abdul Matin Khasru, Member of Parliament and former Minister, was elected President of the association. After the death of Abdul Matin Khasru, in a Special General Meeting held on 04.05.2021 A. M Amin Uddin, Senior Advocate has been elected as President of the Supreme Court Bar Association for the third time.

On 27 April 2022, Advocate Md. Momtaz Uddin Fakir was elected President and  Abdun Noor Dulal was elected Secretary of the association.

See also

 Bangladesh Bar Council

References

1972 establishments in Bangladesh
Organisations based in Dhaka
Bar associations of Asia
Legal organisations based in Bangladesh